Torino di Sangro is a comune and town in the province of Chieti in the Abruzzo region of central Italy.

Main sights
Cemetery Sangro River

References

Cities and towns in Abruzzo